The 40th New York State Legislature, consisting of the New York State Senate and the New York State Assembly, met from November 5, 1816, to April 15, 1817, during the tenth year of Daniel D. Tompkins's governorship, and while John Tayler was Acting Governor, in Albany.

Background
Under the provisions of the New York Constitution of 1777, amended by the Constitutional Convention of 1801, 32 Senators were elected on general tickets in the four senatorial districts for four-year terms. They were divided into four classes, and every year eight Senate seats came up for election. Assemblymen were elected countywide on general tickets to a one-year term, the whole Assembly being renewed annually.

In 1797, Albany was declared the State capital, and all subsequent Legislatures have been meeting there ever since. In 1799, the Legislature enacted that future Legislatures meet on the last Tuesday of January of each year unless called earlier by the governor.

On April 17, 1815, the Legislature had re-apportioned the Senate districts, to take effect in May 1815: Dutchess, Putnam and Rockland Co. (and 1 seat) were transferred from the Middle to the Southern District; Albany Co. from the Eastern, and Chenango, Otsego and Schoharie Co. from the Western (and 3 seats) were transferred to the Middle District; Herkimer, Jefferson, Lewis and St. Lawrence Co. (and 3 seats) were transferred from the Western to the Eastern District. However, the State senators already in office, and the senators elected in April 1815 under the previous apportionment, should represent the District in which they resided. When taking their seats at the next session in January 1816, in three districts there was a number of senators differing from the apportionment, which was corrected at the election in 1816.

On February 20, 1816, a caucus of Democratic-Republican legislators nominated Gov. Daniel D. Tompkins and Lt. Gov. John Tayler for re-election. The Federalists nominated U.S. Senator Rufus King for Governor; and State Senator George Tibbits for Lieutenant Governor.

At this time the politicians were divided into two opposing political parties: the Federalists and the Democratic-Republicans.

Elections
The State election was held from April 30 to May 2, 1816. Gov. Daniel D. Tompkins and Lt. Gov. John Tayler were re-elected.

Senator Martin Van Buren (Middle D.) was re-elected. Walter Bowne, John D. Ditmis (both Southern D.), John Noyes, Peter Swart (both Middle D.), Ephraim Hart, John Knox and William Mallery (all three Western D.) were also elected to the Senate. All eight were Democratic-Republicans.

Sessions
The Legislature met at the Old State Capitol in Albany on November 5, 1816, to elect presidential electors; and adjourned on November 12.

David Woods (Dem.-Rep.) was elected Speaker with 84 votes against 33 for James Emott (Fed.).

On November 8, the Legislature chose 29 electors, all Democratic-Republicans: Henry Rutgers, Lemuel Chipman, John W. Seaman, Jacob Drake, James Fairlie, Theodorus W. Van Wyck, Joseph D. Monell, John Blake Jr., Jacob Wertz, Gabriel North, Charles E. Dudley, Benjamin Smith, Samuel Lewis, Alexander McNish, Artemus Aldrich, Augustus Wright, Peter S. Van Orden, Henry Becker, Aaron Haring, Israel W. Clark, Daniel Root, Montgomery Hunt, Nicoll Fosdick, Eliphalet Edmonds, George Pettit, Richard Townley, Samuel Lawrence, Nathaniel Rochester and Worthy L. Churchill. They cast their votes for James Monroe and Daniel D. Tompkins.

The Legislature met for the regular session on January 14, 1817; and adjourned on April 15.

On January 28, Gov. Tompkins sent a message to the Legislature, "recommending the entire abolition of slavery in the state of New-York, to take place on the 4th of July, 1827," which was passed into law during this session.

On February 12, the Legislature elected Gerrit L. Dox (Dem.-Rep.) to succeed Charles Z. Platt (Fed.) as New York State Treasurer.

On February 24, Gov. Tompkins resigned, to take office as U.S. Vice President on March 4. Lt. Gov. John Tayler became Acting Governor for the remainder of the legislative year, until June 30; and Philetus Swift (Dem.-Rep.) was elected president pro tempore of the State Senate.

On March 25, the first ever State Convention met to nominate a candidate for Governor of New York. The Democratic-Republican party members from counties which were represented in the Assembly by Federalists had complained that these counties were not taking any part in the nomination under the previous system, under which candidates were nominated by legislative caucus. This time, a Democratic-Republican convention composed of the State legislators, and delegates elected in the Federalist counties, nominated Canal Commissioner DeWitt Clinton for Governor, and Acting Gov. John Tayler for Lieutenant Governor. Clinton received 85 votes against 41 for Peter B. Porter.

State Senate

Districts
The Southern District (6 seats) consisted of Dutchess, Kings, New York, Putnam, Queens, Richmond, Rockland, Suffolk and Westchester counties.
The Middle District (9 seats) consisted of Albany, Chenango, Columbia, Delaware, Greene, Orange, Otsego, Schoharie, Sullivan and Ulster counties.
The Eastern District (8 seats) consisted of Clinton, Essex, Franklin, Herkimer, Jefferson, Lewis, Montgomery, Rensselaer,  St. Lawrence, Saratoga, Schenectady, Warren and Washington counties.
The Western District (9 seats) consisted of Allegany, Broome, Cattaraugus, Cayuga, Chautauqua, Cortland, Genesee, Madison,  Niagara, Oneida, Onondaga, Ontario, Seneca, Steuben and Tioga counties.

Note: There are now 62 counties in the State of New York. The counties which are not mentioned in this list had not yet been established, or sufficiently organized, the area being included in one or more of the abovementioned counties.

Members
The asterisk (*) denotes members of the previous Legislature who continued in office as members of this Legislature.

Employees
Clerk: John F. Bacon

State Assembly

Districts

Albany County (4 seats)
Allegany and Steuben counties (2 seats)
Broome County (1 seat)
Cattaraugus, Chautauqua and Niagara counties (2 seats)
Cayuga County (4 seats)
Chenango County (3 seats)
Clinton and Franklin counties (1 seat)
Columbia County (4 seats)
Cortland County (1 seat)
Delaware County (2 seats)
Dutchess County (5 seats)
Essex County (1 seat)
Genesee County (3 seats)
Greene County (2 seats)
Herkimer County (3 seats)
Jefferson County (2 seats)
Kings County (1 seat)
Lewis County (1 seat)
Madison County (3 seats)
Montgomery County (5 seats)
The City and County of New York (11 seats)
Oneida County (5 seats)
Onondaga County (4 seats)
Ontario County (7 seats)
Orange County (4 seats)
Otsego County (5 seats)
Putnam County (1 seat)
Queens County (3 seats)
Rensselaer County (5 seats)
Richmond County (1 seat)
Rockland County (1 seat)
St. Lawrence County (1 seat)
Saratoga County (4 seats)
Schenectady County (2 seats)
Schoharie County (3 seats)
Seneca County (3 seats)
Suffolk County (3 seats)
Sullivan and Ulster counties (4 seats)
Tioga County (1 seat)
Warren and Washington counties (5 seats)
Westchester County (3 seats)

Note: There are now 62 counties in the State of New York. The counties which are not mentioned in this list had not yet been established, or sufficiently organized, the area being included in one or more of the abovementioned counties.

Assemblymen
The asterisk (*) denotes members of the previous Legislature who continued as members of this Legislature.

Employees
Clerk: Aaron Clark
Sergeant-at-Arms: Thomas Donnelly
Doorkeeper: Benjamin Whipple

Notes

Sources
The New York Civil List compiled by Franklin Benjamin Hough (Weed, Parsons and Co., 1858) [see pg. 108f for Senate districts; pg. 123 for senators; pg. 148f for Assembly districts; pg. 191f for assemblymen; pg. 321 and 325 for presidential election]
The History of Political Parties in the State of New-York, from the Ratification of the Federal Constitution to 1840 by Jabez D. Hammond (4th ed., Vol. 1, H. & E. Phinney, Cooperstown, 1846; pages 425-442)
Election result Assembly, Broome Co. at project "A New Nation Votes", compiled by Phil Lampi, hosted by Tufts University Digital Library
Election result Assembly, Clinton and Franklin Co. at project "A New Nation Votes"
Election result Assembly, Cortland Co. at project "A New Nation Votes"
Partial election result Assembly, Dutchess Co. at project "A New Nation Votes" [gives no candidates' names]
Election result Assembly, Essex Co. at project "A New Nation Votes"
Partial election result Assembly, Greene Co. at project "A New Nation Votes" [gives no candidates' names]
Election result Assembly, Kings Co. at project "A New Nation Votes"
Election result Assembly, Montgomery Co. at project "A New Nation Votes"
Election result Assembly, Onondaga Co. at project "A New Nation Votes"
Election result Assembly, Rensselaer Co. at project "A New Nation Votes"
Election result Assembly, St. Lawrence Co. at project "A New Nation Votes"
Election result Assembly, Schenectady Co. at project "A New Nation Votes"
Election result Assembly, Sullivan and Ulster Co. at project "A New Nation Votes"
Election result Assembly, Westchester Co. at project "A New Nation Votes" 
Partial election result Senate, Southern D. at project "A New Nation Votes" [gives only votes of Kings and Westchester Co.]
Partial election result Senate, Middle D. at project "A New Nation Votes" [gives only votes from Sullivan and Ulster Co.]
Partial election result Senate, Western D. at project "A New Nation Votes" [gives only votes of Broome, Cortland and Onondaga Co.]
Election result, Speaker at project "A New Nation Votes" [gives wrong party affiliations]

040
1816 in New York (state)
1817 in New York (state)
1816 U.S. legislative sessions